KHCH (1410 AM, 98.7 FM) is an Ethnic Christian radio station, relayed by an FM translator, licensed to Huntsville, Texas. KHCH broadcasts in the languages of Spanish, Vietnamese, Cantonese, and Mandarin, and is owned by Houston Christian Broadcasters, Inc.

Translator

References

External links
KHCH's Spanish language website
KHCH's Vietnamese language website
KHCH's Cantonese and Mandarin website
KHCB radio network's website

Cantonese-language radio stations
Chinese-American culture in Texas
HCH
Mandarin-language radio stations
HCH
HCH
Huntsville, Texas